Humnabad is a city and municipal council in the Bidar District of the Indian state of Karnataka. Humnabad is the headquarters of Humnabad taluk.It is famous for The Veerabhadreswar Temple.It is at the center of Bidar and Kalaburgi District.It is at a distance of 60km from both the districts.It is well connected by roadways and railway network.It is connected by two national Highways NH-50 & NH-65.

Geography
It has an average elevation of 638 metres (2093 feet). 
Humnabad consists of 112 Villages and 34 Panchayats.

Demographics
, Humnabad had a population of 3,32,362. Males constituted 51% of the population and females 49%. Kannada is the most spoken language of Humnabad.

Significance
Humnabad is known for its rich heritage of temples and proximity to Andhra Pradesh and Maharashtra. It is known for Shri Veerabhadreshwar Temple, Jai Bhavani Temple, Shri Manik Prabhu Devasthanam  temple is dedicated to a great ascetic.

Religious Centers

The Manik Prabhu Temple is located on the confluence of two holy rivulets Viraja and Guru Ganga  , Banashankari Temple in Nandgaon village. Every year on 26 January, 12 days Shri Veerbhadreshwara jatra Mohotsav is celebrated devotees visit and take darshan many people come from North Karnataka, Maharashtra (MH), Andhra, Telangana.

Transport
Humnabad is connected by two national highways NH-65 and State Highway NH-218. In fact, NH 218 begins from Humnabad itself. Now, NH-9 is rechristened as NH-65. Also, new railway line is laid from Bidar to Gulbarga and regular train services have started from Bidar to Gulbarga via Humanabad.

See also 
 Aurad
 Basavakalyan
 Bhalki
 Bidar

References

External links
Humnabad railway station
 Official Website of Humnabad Town Municipal Council

Cities and towns in Bidar district